State Road 154, in the U.S. State of Indiana, is a short two-lane east–west highway located in western Sullivan County.

Route description

State Road 154 begins at the Wabash River bridge across from Hutsonville, Illinois and runs eastward through Graysville, where it crosses State Road 63.  It ends where it meets U.S. Route 41 just west of Sullivan.

Major intersections

References

External links

 Indiana Highway Ends - SR 154

154
Transportation in Sullivan County, Indiana